Patterns of Prejudice is a peer-reviewed academic journal dedicated to the study of historical and contemporary intolerance and social exclusion. Published by Taylor & Francis, the articles are selected via a double-blind method, and publications are issued five times a year. The journal was founded in 1967 to study "racial and religious prejudice" throughout the world and report on contemporary political events.

See also
 Institute for Jewish Policy Research
 American Jewish Committee

References

External links
 
 

Publications established in 1967
English-language journals
Quarterly journals
Political science journals
History journals